Natasha Moraa Anasi (born 2 October 1991) is a footballer who plays as a defender for Brann.

Born and raised in the United States, Anasi played college football for the Duke Blue Devils before moving to Iceland in 2014, where she joined Úrvalsdeild kvenna club ÍBV. She moved to fellow Icelandic club Keflavík ÍF in 2017. After receiving Icelandic citizenship in December 2019, Anasi made her international debut for the Iceland national team in March 2020.

Early life
Anasi was born on 2 October 1991, in Irving, Texas, to John and Jane Anasi. She has two brothers, one younger (Andre) and one older (Kevin), and a younger sister (Stephanie). She is of Kenyan descent.

College career
From 2010 to 2013, Anasi played college football for the Duke Blue Devils. During the four seasons, she appeared in 97 games, netting 4 goals. In 2011, she was named the Atlantic Coast Conference Defensive Player of the Year.

Club career
Anasi joined ÍBV in 2014 and played with the team for three seasons. In 2016, she helped ÍBV to the Icelandic Cup final where the team lost to Breiðablik. In 2017, she joined Keflavík. After playing the majority of her career as a defender, she moved to the middlefielder position after joining Keflavík.

In November 2021, Anasi signed with Úrvalsdeild club Breiðablik.

National team career
Anasi trained with the United States U-18 team during the spring of 2010. She trained with the United States U-23 team in the spring of 2012 and 2013. The later year, she traveled with the U-23 team to La Manga, Spain, to play in the Four Nations Tournament.

In 2019, Anasi received an Icelandic citizenship and in February 2020, she was selected to the Icelandic national team for the first time. On 4 March 2020, Anasi made her senior debut for Iceland in a 1–0 friendly win against Northern Ireland. On 20 February 2022, she scored her first goal for Iceland when she scored the first goal in Iceland's 2-1 victory against Czech Republic.

In October 2022, Anasi joined Brann.

Personal life
Anasi is married to basketball coach Rún­ar Ingi Erl­ings­son.

References

External links 
 
 
 Duke Blue Devils bio at goduke.com

1991 births
Living people
21st-century African-American sportspeople
21st-century African-American women
African-American women's soccer players
American emigrants to Iceland
American people of Kenyan descent
American sportspeople of African descent
American women's soccer players
Boston Breakers draft picks
Duke Blue Devils women's soccer players
Natasha Anasi
Natasha Anasi
Icelandic people of Kenyan descent
Natasha Anasi
Natasha Anasi
People from Irving, Texas
Sportspeople of Kenyan descent
Natasha Anasi
Soccer players from Texas
Sportspeople from Arlington, Texas
Sportspeople from the Dallas–Fort Worth metroplex
Natasha Anasi
Women's association football defenders
Women's association football midfielders